Frances Joseph is an Australian-born sculptor and academic. She is a full professor at Auckland University of Technology.

Academic career 

Joseph has a BA in visual art from the University of Tasmania and a Master of Fine Art from the College of Fine Arts at the University of New South Wales. She was awarded a PhD by Auckland University of Technology in 2010. The title of her doctoral thesis was Mnemotechne of design — ontology and design research theories.
Joseph moved to New Zealand in 1997, working in the School of Art and Design. In 2007 she became director of AUT's Textile and Design Lab and in 2009 director of CoLab. She was appointed a full professor at the Auckland University of Technology in November 2018.

Selected works

Personal 
A portrait of Joseph and her son by Rosemary Valadon was selected as a finalist for the 1990 Archibald Prize and won the Portia Geach Memorial Award the following year.

References

External links 

 Five questions: Professor Frances Joseph – interview 
One flesh ll – portrait of Frances Joseph (sculptor) and son – 1990 Archibald portrait 
 
 
 

Living people
Year of birth missing (living people)
New Zealand women academics
University of Tasmania alumni
University of New South Wales alumni
Auckland University of Technology alumni
Academic staff of the Auckland University of Technology
Australian sculptors

Australian emigrants to New Zealand